"Mind Playing Tricks on Me" is a song by Geto Boys, featured on their 1991 album We Can't Be Stopped .
The lyrics describe the mental anguish and exhaustion of life as a gangster, including dealing with symptoms of post-traumatic stress disorder, paranoia, suicidal ideation, and loneliness. It also samples "Hung Up on My Baby" by Isaac Hayes, from his 1974 film Tough Guys. At the song's peak, it reached 23 on the Billboard Hot 100, making it the highest-charting single by the Geto Boys.

Background 
The song was originally intended for a Scarface solo album as he penned three of the song's four verses. However, the Geto Boys' label, Rap-A-Lot Records, decided that the record would be more valuable as a breakout single for the group.

On an episode of Yo! MTV Raps: Classic Cuts, Scarface and his grandmother spoke about how she inspired the track "Mind Playing Tricks on Me". Scarface's grandmother was reportedly mumbling to herself, and when asked, "'Mama, what you talkin' about?'" replied, "'Oh, nothing, my mind's just playing tricks on me'".

Reception and legacy 
"Mind Playing Tricks on Me" has received critical praise since it was first released. In 2012, Rolling Stone Magazine ranked it the fifth greatest hip-hop song of all time and at No. 192 on their "Top 500 Best Songs of All Time". The song was ranked number 18 out of 100 Best Rap Songs Of All Time by LiveAbout. VH1 ranked the song 82 on its list of the 100 Greatest Songs of the 90's, and 45 on its list of the 100 Greatest Songs of Hip Hop. Pitchfork Media ranked the song 45 on its Top 200 Tracks of the 1990s list, with reviewer Tom Breihan writing, "this track established the South as a serious force in the music, proving that these Texans could do dark better than anyone on either coast." The song was also included in The Pitchfork 500, a compilation book of the greatest 500 songs from 1976 to 2006.

On a 2019 episode of NPR's Morning Edition, Rodney Carmichael described the song as unique because at the time of its release it emphasized the trauma and vulnerability of life in the streets.

References and sampling 
"Mind Playing Tricks on Me" has been referenced and sampled by numerous artists. The Kottonmouth Kings made a cover of the song for their 2001 album, Hidden Stash II: The Kream of the Krop. The Insane Clown Posse also covered the song with Anybody Killa (also known as ABK) and Lil Wyte on their 2012 album, Smothered, Covered & Chunked. Brazilian rapper, Gabriel o Pensador sampled "Mind Playing Tricks on Me" in his song, "Lavagem Cerebral", from the 1993 album, Gabriel o Pensador. Rapper Kodak Black sampled the song in his song, Transportin’.

"Mind Playing Tricks on Me" was referenced by Prodigy, in his single, "Mac 10 Handle". Ice Cube referenced the song in, "When Will They Shoot". Hip-hop duo, Clipse, referenced the Geto Boys song on "Nightmares", off of their 2006 album, Hell Hath No Fury. The Notorious B.I.G. interpolates "Mind Playing Tricks on Me" on the 1994 song, "One More Chance". In the Outkast song, "She Lives in My Lap", Andre 3000 samples Scarface's vocals from the track. The Game's track, "Walk in the Streets" references the song with the lines: "Must I remind you that Geto Boy track/Your mind is playin' tricks on you, you'll never go plat". The Game further references the Geto Boys' track in his 2010 song, "Big Money", with the hook, "I got big money, I drive big cars/Everybody know me/It's like I'm a movie star". Beanie Sigel's "Feel It In the Air" off of his 2005 album, "The B. Coming" samples Scarface's introduction to the song by rapping, "I sit alone in my four cornered room staring at hammers". Destiny's Child interpolates "Mind Playing Tricks on Me" in their 1998 song, "Illusion", featuring Wyclef and Pras, from their self-titled debut album. A vocal sample from "Mind Playing Tricks on Me" is used in Killer Mike's "Big Money, Big Cars" featuring Chamillionaire and Messy Marv released in 2008 on the album, I Pledge Allegiance to the Grind II. Additionally, rapper Jean Grae references Geto Boys' rapper, Bushwick Bill's dream sequence from "Mind Playing Tricks on Me" in her 2004 song, "Going Crazy".

Atom & His Package covered/parodied the song on his debut album Atom & His Package, also known as The First CD.

In a 2012 Complex Magazine interview, rapper Kid Cudi cited "Mind Playing Tricks on Me" as his "favourite song in the world". Kid Cudi further revealed that the song was the inspiration for his hit single, "Day 'n' Nite", saying, "I love it so much I wanted to make my own version of it. And then "Day 'n' Nite" came out of it". Kid Cudi later sampled the song on his third studio album, Indicud (2013), on the track "Beez" featuring Wu-Tang Clan member, RZA.

It was also featured on popular 2013 video game Grand Theft Auto V on fictional radio station West Coast Classics.

In the 2018 Netflix television miniseries, Maniac, "Mind Playing Tricks on Me" is featured in multiple episodes.

On Atmosphere's 2021 song, "Something", Slug interpolates the line "It wasn't even close to Halloween" for their song.

Track listing

"Mind Playing Tricks on Me" (Radio Version)
"Mind Playing Tricks on Me" (Dirty Version)
"Mind Playing Tricks on Me" (Club Version)
"Mind Playing Tricks on Me" (Instrumental)

Charts

Certifications

References

1991 singles
Geto Boys songs
Gangsta rap songs
Horrorcore songs
1991 songs
Songs about suicide
Songs about diseases and disorders
Songs about loneliness
Priority Records singles